Stella Scamman is a former member of the New Hampshire House of Representatives, represented Rockingham District 13 for three terms before leaving office on December 31, 2010. Before entering politics, Scamman taught history and started a business selling craft supplies. She was also a member of the University of New Hampshire Board of Trustees.

References

Members of the New Hampshire House of Representatives